Ralph Earle (3 May 1874 – 13 February 1939) served the United States Navy during the Spanish–American War and World War I. He was the Chief, Bureau of Ordnance (BUORD) and retired as a rear admiral in 1927.

Biography
Earle was born on 3 May 1874 in Worcester, Massachusetts. He graduated from the United States Naval Academy in 1896.

While on board , he won commendations from the President and Secretary of the Navy for his conduct at the time of a disastrous turret explosion.

He commanded  during the Tampico Affair, and at the U.S. occupation of Veracruz, Mexico, and later commanded .

Ashore, Earle had duty at the U.S. Naval Academy and the Naval Proving Ground. An expert on guns and explosives, he was made Chief of the Bureau of Ordnance shortly before the United States entered World War I.

Under his administration the North Sea mine barrage was conceived and executed using a new type of mine, and the plan of mounting naval 14-inch guns on railway cars for use as long-range artillery on the Western Front, was evolved and carried out.

After his retirement in 1925, Rear Admiral Earle served as president of Worcester Polytechnic Institute until his death.  Earle, well loved as WPI's sixth president implemented a five-year plan which brought the students a swimming pool and a new hall named after R. Sanford Riley among other needed campus improvements. He also served as president of the Worcester Economic Club in 1931.

He died of a stroke on 13 February 1939 in Worcester, Massachusetts.

Honored in ship naming
The , launched 10 December 1941 by Boston Navy Yard, was named in his honor. The launch was sponsored by Mrs. John F. Hines, Jr., daughter of Rear Admiral Earle.

The Naval Weapons Station Earle (New Jersey) was also named (in 1943) to honor the admiral because of his strong association with ordnance projects.

See also

 United States Navy
 World War I

References

Further reading

Photo of grave of Ralph Earle in Friends Cemetery Leceister, MA 
 Earle Bridge at Worcester Polytechnic Institute, Worcester, MA
 Photo of A. Atwater Kent receiving honorary degree from WPI President Ralph Earle
Worcester Engineering Society Collection with information on candidates for the Admiral Ralph Earle Award
 A Bright Chapter within Two Towers: The Story of Worcester Tech by Mildred McClary Tymeson about Earle's Presidency at WPI
 Tech Presidents

Further reading 
 Diaries of Ruth Earle Southwick 1921-1925, . Ruth Earle Southwick was Ralph Earle's only sister.

1874 births
1939 deaths
United States Navy rear admirals (upper half)
People from Worcester, Massachusetts
United States Navy personnel of the Spanish–American War
United States Navy personnel of World War I
United States Naval Academy alumni
Presidents of Worcester Polytechnic Institute
Military personnel from Massachusetts